Critical Perspectives on Accounting is a peer-reviewed academic journal published by Elsevier. The aim of the journal is to study how accounting works within society and to promote forms of accounting that are in the public interest. It was established in 1990 with David J. Cooper (University of Alberta), and A.M. Tinker (Baruch College) as founding editors-in-chief. They were succeeded in 2008 by Marcia Annisette, Christine Cooper, and Dean Neu. The current editors-in-chief are Jane Andrew (University of Sydney Business School), Christine Cooper (University of Edinburgh Business School), and Yves Gendron (Université Laval).

Abstracting and indexing
The journal is abstracted and indexed in the Accountants Index, Current Contents/Social & Behavioral Sciences, EBSCO databases, International Bibliography of the Social Sciences, ProQuest databases, RePEc, Scopus, and Social Sciences Citation Index. According to the Journal Citation Reports, the journal has a 2021 impact factor of 5.538.

#ULSB16 controversy 
In January 2021, sixteen academics were targeted for redundancy by the University of Leicester School of Business because they had published articles in Critical Perspectives on Accounting. Publishing in this journal was treated as evidence of unsuitable scholarship, hence a basis for redundancy. The University of Leicester aimed to shed critical management scholarship as part of a strategic reorientation of the School towards a more mainstream outlook. The sixteen faculty members were being targeted because of their engagement in critical scholarship areas deemed not sufficiently congenial with the new vision of the School. The Head of the College of Social Sciences, Arts and Humanities (a sociologist) stated that management research should not be informed by a sociological perspective.

Notable articles
According to Google Scholar, the most heavily cited articles are:

References

External links

Accounting journals
English-language journals
Publications established in 1990
Elsevier academic journals
8 times per year journals